This is a list of women photographers who were born in France or whose works are closely associated with that country.

A
 Leila Alaoui (1982–2016), French-Moroccan commercial photographer and video artist

B
 Martine Barrat (date of birth unknown), based in New York, has photographed the black inhabitants of Harlem since the early 1980s
 Claude Batho (1935–1981), remembered for the detailed images of her home and for her series on Claude Monet's garden at Giverny
 Valérie Belin (born 1964), whose photographs have played with the distinction between illusion and reality
 Denise Bellon (1902–1999), associated with the Surrealist movement
 Marie-Lydie Cabanis Bonfils (1837–1918), photographer active in the Middle East and co-founder of Maison Bonfils photography studio in Beirut
 Marguerite Bornhauser (born 1989), visual artist and photographer
 Alexandra Boulat (1962–2007), photojournalist and co-founder of the VII Photo Agency
 Adeline Boutain (1862–1946), photographer, postcard publisher

C
 Claude Cahun (1894–1954), photographer and artist, remembered for her self-portraits (1927–47)
 Sophie Calle (born 1953), writer, photographer and installation artist, also photography professor
 Georgette Chadourne (1899–1983), surrealist photographer
 Vivienne Chandler (1947–2013), actress and professional photographer
 Yvonne Chevalier (1899–1982), magazine photographer

D
 Dominique Darbois (1925–2014), photojournalist who has concentrated on the victims of European colonialism
 Sophie Delaporte (born 1971), fashion photographer
 Françoise Demulder (1947–2008), war photographer
 Stéphanie Di Giusto (active since 2004), film director, photographer, art director
 Delphine Diallo (born 1977), French-Senegalese art photographer
 Geneviève Élisabeth Disdéri (c.1817–1878), early photographer, wife of André-Adolphe-Eugène Disdéri
 Suzanne Doppelt (born 1956), writer, photographer and educator
 Claudine Doury (born 1959), photojournalist

F
 Flore (born 1963), French-Spanish artistic photographer
 Gisèle Freund (1908–2000), German-born, known for her documentary photography and portraits of writers and artists

G
 Gaëlle Ghesquière (born 1972), photographer, writer, journalist, portraits of pop artists
 Laure Albin Guillot (1879–1962), portraits of Paris celebrities, wide variety of other genres, several high-ranking administrative positions

H
 Genevieve Hafner (fl 2003), street photographer based in New York
 Florence Henri (1893–1982), surrealist
 Françoise Huguier (born 1942), travel photographer

I
 Irina Ionesco (born 1930), erotic images of lavishly dressed women posing provocatively
 Dominique Issermann (born 1947), portrait and fashion photographer

J
 Valérie Jouve (born 1964), photographer, filmmaker

K
 Germaine Krull (1897–1985), photographically-illustrated books, photojournalism
 Bénédicte Kurzen (born 1980), photographer and photojournalist based in Nigeria
 Anouk Masson Krantz, photographer, living in the United States

L
 Brigitte Lacombe (born 1950), photographer of film sets
 Louise Laffon (1828–1885), early photographer with a studio in Paris from 1859
 Suzanne Lafont (born 1949), art photographer
 Camille Lepage (1988–2014), photojournalist
 Catherine Leroy (1945–2006), photojournalist, particularly known for her photography of the Vietnam war
 Natacha Lesueur (born 1971), photographer and plasticist
 Ariane Lopez-Huici (born 1945), art photographer

M
 Benedicte Van der Maar (born 1968), art photography, human photography
 Dora Maar (1907–1997), both a commercial and a street photographer in the 1920s and 30s
 Mayotte Magnus (born 1934), French-born photographer based in England
 Alix Marie (born 1989), artist working with photography and sculpture
 Isabelle Massieu (1844–1932), travel writer and photographer
 Sarah Moon (born 1941), fashion photographer, now concentrating on gallery work

N
 Anaïs Napoleón (1827–1912), pioneering French-Spanish photographer
 Janine Niépce (1921–2007), prolific photojournalist
 Françoise Nuñez (1957–2021), travel photographer

P
 Sabine Pigalle (born 1963), travel photographer
 Kate Polin (born 1967), art photographer

R
 Ann Ray (born 1969), artist and photographer
 Bettina Rheims (born 1952), strip-tease artists and acrobats, stuffed animals, also advertising, and photography of nude women making her a best-seller
 Sophie Ristelhueber (born 1949), who has photographed the effects of war on landscape
 Emmanuelle Riva (1927–2017), primarily an actor but also a noted and published photographer

S
 Lise Sarfati (born 1958), images of listless young people in Russia and the United States
 Stéphane Sednaoui (born 1963), reportages, portraits, fashion
 Christine Spengler (born 1945), photojournalist who has concentrated on the victims of war

T
 Yvette Troispoux (1914–2007), remembered for photographing people at social events

V
 Agnès Varda (1928–2019), film director and photographer, documentary realism, feminist issues
 Jenny de Vasson (1872–1920), highly productive early female photographer
 Véronique de Viguerie (born 1978), photojournalist, particularly known for her photography of the most recent Afghan war

See also
 List of women photographers
 List of French photographers

-
French women photographers, List of
Photographers
Photographers